Leptobrachella picta is a species of frog in the family Megophryidae. It is found in northern Borneo: Crocker Range, Sabah and eastern Sarawak Malaysia as well as adjacent north-eastern Kalimantan, Indonesia. Its type locality is Mount Kinabalu. Its natural habitats are tropical moist lowland forests, moist montane forests, and rivers. It is threatened by habitat loss.

References

picta
Amphibians of Indonesia
Amphibians of Malaysia
Endemic fauna of Borneo
Amphibians described in 1992
Taxonomy articles created by Polbot
Amphibians of Borneo